Panglian is a small village in Ludhiana district in the Indian state of Punjab.  It is located off of a main road going from Ludhiana to Chandigarh (capital city of Punjab) between Kohara and Katani.  Most people of the village are farmers by trade, but now the village is being consumed by the surrounding urban development.

About Panglian

 It is located 18 km towards East from District headquarters Ludhiana
 22 km from Ludhiana-1
 84 km from State capital Chandigarh Panglian Pin code is 141113 and postal head office is Katani Kalan
 Hiran (1 km), Barwala(1 km), Chhandaran(2.5 km) Chak sarwan nath (1.5 km)Rampur ( 2.5 km ), Kohara(4 km), Katana sahib(4 km)Katani Kalan ( 4 km ), Raian ( 4 km ), Kanech ( 4 km ), Mangarh ( 3 km ), Sahnewal(7 km), Doraha(7 km) are the nearby Villages to Panglian
 Panglian is surrounded by Samrala Tehsil towards East, Machhiwara Tehsil towards East, Ludhiana-1 Tehsil towards west, Ludhiana-2 Tehsil towards west
 Ludhiana, Khanna, Ahmedgarh, Phillaur, Sirhind, Samrala, Ropar, Fatehgarh sahib are the nearby Cities to Panglian
 Panglian is famous for big cricket tournaments organised by the sportsman's of the village. 
 Demographics of Panglian Punjabi is the Local Language here.
 Main street of the village is also called as downtown of the village and is also famous in neighbouring villages.
 Some famous personalities of village 

Santa ,Dhianu,Gurdhian,Janta,
 Parminder
 Simma
 mushki
 Moore
 thaila
 Binni
 Peter(varinder)
 Harsukhraj singh haryanvi 
 harnoor
And many more soormas

References
http://www.bharatbrand.com/english/punjab/districts/Ludhiana/Ludhiana.html

Villages in Ludhiana district